Natalya Melik Melikyan (Armenian: Նատալյա Մելիքի Մելիքյան) (May 20, 1906 – July 25, 1989) was an Armenian scientist.

Biography 
Natalya Melikyan (Ter-Meliksetyan) was born on May 20, 1906, in the Murshudali Armenian-populated village of the Surmalinsky Uyezd, Erivan Governorate of the Russian Empire. Her father was Melik Ter-Meliksetyan and her mother was Mariam Mkrtchian. Melikyan studied at Iğdır primary school for two years. In 1918, surviving the Armenian genocide, the Melikyan family found a refuge in Yerevan.

In 1926, Melikyan graduated from the Yerevan Secondary School N2 after Al. Myasnikyan, Yerevan and for two years worked as a teacher in the Hrazdan region. In 1928–1931, she studied in the Department of Biology of Yerevan State University. After graduating from the university, she was accepted to the PhD program of the Plant Anatomy and Physiology Department and conducted her research in the Plant Physiology Department of Moscow State University under the supervision of Dmitriy Sabinin in 1933.

In 1931, Melikyan married Barsegh Grigor Muradian, and they had two children. Her husband died in May 1942.

In 1934, returning to Yerevan, she started working in the newly established Plant Anatomy and Physiology Department of Yerevan State University as a teaching assistant, and afterwards as head of a laboratory. In 1939, under the supervision of Professor S.D. Lvov's, chair of the Plant Physiology department at Leningrad University, she defended her dissertation with the title "Survey on linseed oil in Armenia," and in 1940 she received the title of associate professor. During those years, in collaboration with biologist Alexander Araratyan, she studied oil-producing wild plants, aiming to put them in mass production. However, the Second World War interrupted the implementation of all of the projects.

Collaborating with  Mikhail Chailakhyan, who arrived from Moscow, Melikyan studied the accumulation of lignin in plant stalks and its anatomical features. The results were summed up in her monograph "Structural changes in plants and lignin accumulation dynamics, depending on environmental conditions," published in 1959. In 1964, Melikyan defended her doctoral dissertation and in 1966 was awarded the academic title of professor.

In 1962–1977, Melikyan headed the Department of Plant Anatomy and Physiology of Yerevan State University, and, in 1977–1985, she was professor and counselor at the same department. In 1962–1982, she was the head of the "anatomical, physiological and biochemical characteristics of tuber-forming plants" scientific program conducted by the department.

Melikyan was awarded the Order of the Badge of Honour (1953) and received a number of medals and diplomas from the government. She also was awarded the title of Honored Scientist of the Armenian Soviet Socialist Republic (1967).

In 1989, Melikyan died at the age of 83 in Yerevan.

References 

N.Melikyan, Structural changes in plants and lignin accumulation dynamics, depending on environmental conditions, Yerevan University Publishing House, Yerevan 1959
N.Melikyan, Anatomical changes and the dynamics of lignin accumulation in plants, Biological Sciences doctoral dissertation thesis, Yerevan, 1964
 Yerevan State University, Yerevan University Publishing House, Yerevan 1970
V.A.Eghyan, Armenian Prominent Women, Armenia, Yerevan 1971
 Yerevan University weekly N30 (1626) N.M.Melikyan 7 October 1989
L.P. Gharibjanyan, H.K. Gasparyan, Our Eminent Professors, Yerevan University Publishing House, Yerevan 2006
 Armenian Women Encyclopedia, 2 volumes, Amaras, Yerevan 2011

External links 
 Library of the Institute of Forest after V.N. Sukachov,  Siberian Branch of Russian Academy of Sciences

1906 births
1989 deaths
People from Iğdır
People from Erivan Governorate
Armenian biologists
Yerevan State University alumni
20th-century biologists